A cross is a geometrical figure consisting of two intersecting lines or bars.

Cross or The Cross may also refer to:

Religion
 Christian cross, the basic symbol of Christianity
 Cross necklace, a necklace worn by adherents of the Christian religion
 Scientology cross, a symbol of Scientology

Business
 A. T. Cross Company, manufacturer of pens
 Cross (studio), a Japanese adult video producer
 The Cross (nightclub), a defunct nightclub in London, UK

Entertainment
 Cross (manga), a 1997 manga series by Sumiko Amakawa
 Cross (TV series), a 2018 South Korean TV series
 Cross (novel), a novel by James Patterson
 Cross, a 2009 film starring Bai Ling
 Cross (1987 film), a French crime film written and directed by Philippe Setbon
 Cross (2011 film), an action film
 Cross (2012 film), a crime thriller film
 The Cross (2009 film), a documentary film directed by Matthew Crouch

Music
 The Cross (band), a side project of Queen's Roger Taylor
 The Cross, a song from Prince's album Sign o' the Times
 Cross (Justice album), 2007, stylized as †
 Cross (Sayuri Ishikawa album), 2012, stylized as X -Cross-
 Cross (Luna Sea album), 2019
 "Cross", a song by Band-Maid from Just Bring It
 "The Cross", song by Nas from God's Son (album)
 "The Cross", a song by Prince from Sign o' the Times

Mathematics
 Cross product, a binary operation on vectors in a three-dimensional Euclidean space
 cross, a symbol in a system of symbolic logic developed by G. Spencer-Brown in his book Laws of Form
 Cross, the square of the cosine in Rational trigonometry

Objects
 Cross (crown), the decoration located at the highest level of a crown
 X mark, a typographic mark that indicates negation, opposite to a check mark
 Cross (plumbing)

People
 Cross (surname), people with the surname

Fictional characters
 Alex Cross, a fictional character and the protagonist in a few James Patterson novels
 Carland Cross, a fictional character and the protagonist in the Carland Cross TV series and novels
 Cross Marian, a fictional character in the manga D.Gray-man
 Doctor Gina Cross, a fictional character in the Half-Life video game series
 Noah Cross, a fictional character and villain in the 1974 film Chinatown
 Sgt. Cross, a fictional character featured in the Need For Speed: Most Wanted and Need For Speed: Carbon video games
 Cross, one of the main characters in the manga and anime Ginga: Nagareboshi Gin

Places
 Cross Island (disambiguation)
 Cross Lake (disambiguation)
 Cross River (disambiguation)

Australia
 Kings Cross, New South Wales, inner-city locality of Sydney, colloquially known as The Cross

United States

 Cross, South Carolina
 Cross, West Virginia
 Cross, Wisconsin
 Cross Seamount, Hawaii

England
 Cross, Croyde, North Devon
 Cross, Goodleigh, North Devon
 Cross, Shropshire, Shropshire on List of United Kingdom locations: Croe-Cros
 Cross, Somerset

Northern Ireland
 Cross, County Down, a townland in County Down
 Cross, County Antrim, a townland in County Antrim
 Cross, County Armagh, a townland in County Armagh
 Cross, County Fermanagh, a townland in County Fermanagh

Scotland
 Cross, Lewis

Republic of Ireland
 Cross, County Mayo
 Cross, County Clare
Cross (parish), Catholic parish in County Clare

Sports
 Cross (association football), a delivery of a ball from either side of the field across to the front of the goal
 Cross (boxing), a counter-punch used in boxing
 Snowboard cross or Boarder Cross, a snowboard competition
 Cyclo-cross, a race that involves cycling and running while carrying the bike, also called Cross
 Motocross
 Ski cross

Other uses
 Centres régionaux opérationnels de surveillance et de sauvetage (CROSS)
 Cross, short for Crossover, a type of a sport utility vehicle built on a car platform
 Hybrid (biology) (or cross), two distinct genetic lines, one of the basic methods of experimental genetics
 Cross, a synonym for anger

See also
 Crossbreed
 Crosse
 Crossed (disambiguation)
 Crosses (disambiguation)
 Crux (disambiguation)